The 1995 Trans-Am Series was the thirtieth season of the Sports Car Club of America's Trans-Am Series.

Results

Championships

Drivers
Tommy Kendall – 305 points
Ron Fellows – 281 points
Dorsey Schroeder – 269 points
Brian Simo – 213 points
Jamie Galles – 207 points

Manufacturers
Chevrolet – 82 points
Ford – 80 points

References

Trans-Am Series
1995 in American motorsport